Local elections were held in Waveney district every four years to elect councillors to Waveney District Council. In the past, one-third of councillors were elected each year, but in 2010 the council opted to change to a whole council election system. Since the last boundary changes in 2002, 48 councillors have been elected from 23 wards. The district was merged with Suffolk Coastal in April 2019 to form East Suffolk, meaning that the 2015 elections were the final Waveney elections to be held.

Political control
From the first election to the council in 1973 until its abolition in 2019, political control of the council was held by the following parties:

Leadership
The leaders of the council from 2003 until its abolition in 2019 were:

Mark Bee served as leader of the East Suffolk shadow authority prior to the new council coming into effect in 2019, but he was unsuccessful in securing a seat at the first election to the new council.

Council elections
1973 Waveney District Council election
1976 Waveney District Council election
1979 Waveney District Council election 
1983 Waveney District Council election (New ward boundaries)
1984 Waveney District Council election
1986 Waveney District Council election
1987 Waveney District Council election
1988 Waveney District Council election
1990 Waveney District Council election
1991 Waveney District Council election
1992 Waveney District Council election
1994 Waveney District Council election
1995 Waveney District Council election
1996 Waveney District Council election
1998 Waveney District Council election
1999 Waveney District Council election
2000 Waveney District Council election
2002 Waveney District Council election (New ward boundaries)
2003 Waveney District Council election
2004 Waveney District Council election
2006 Waveney District Council election
2007 Waveney District Council election
2008 Waveney District Council election
2010 Waveney District Council election
2011 Waveney District Council election
2015 Waveney District Council election

References

External links
Waveney District Council

 
Council elections in Suffolk
Waveney District
District council elections in England